Elections to Sheffield Council were held on 10 May 1973.

The first elections to the newly created metropolitan borough council were held on 10 May 1973, with the entirety of the 90 seat council - three seats for each of the thirty wards - up for vote. The Local Government Act 1972 stipulated that the elected members were to shadow and eventually take over from the predecessor corporation on 1 April 1974. The order in which the councillors were elected dictated their term serving, with third-place candidates serving two years and up for re-election in 1975, second-placed three years expiring in 1976 and 1st-placed five years until 1978.

Election result

This result had the following consequences for the total number of seats on the Council after the elections:

Ward results

References

1973 English local elections
1973
1970s in Sheffield